Hawthorne High School is a public high school located in Hawthorne, California, within the Centinela Valley Union High School District. It opened in 1951 with 9th and 10th grades.  The first graduating senior class was that of 1954. It is most notable for its association with The Beach Boys, whose original members Brian, Carl, and Dennis Wilson, and Al Jardine attended the school. Coincidentally, Olivia Trinidad Arias, who later became Olivia Harrison (George Harrison’s wife), also attended; she graduated in 1965.

Hawthorne High School is a cross-town rival with Leuzinger High School.

Notable alumni

Athletes
Ron Mix, San Diego Chargers and NFL Hall Of Famer
Scott Laidlaw, running back, Stanford, Dallas Cowboys
Mike Scott, pitcher New York Mets, Houston Astros (1986 Cy Young Award Winner)
Curtis Conway, wide receiver, Chicago Bears, San Diego Chargers
Michael Marsh, 1992 Olympic gold medalist, 200 Meters, 4 x 100 Meter relay; U.S. High School National Record holder in 4 X 400 Meter Relay (3:07:40) on April 6, 1985
Henry Thomas youth record sprinter; U.S. High School National Record holder in 4 X 400 Meter Relay (3:07:40) on April 6, 1985
Mark Lee, 70s relief pitcher for the San Diego Padres Major League team
Cameron Stephenson, offensive lineman for the Green Bay Packers
Carl Boenish, US Parachuting Association Achievement award winner
Adimchinobi Echemandu, running back for the Oakland Raiders
April Jace, former wife of Michael Jace
Treamelle Taylor, Canadian Football League player
Mike Colbern, catcher Chicago White Sox

Musical artists
 The Beach Boys - Brian Wilson / Al Jardine / Dennis Wilson / Carl Wilson / David Marks
 Emitt Rhodes multi-instrumentalist singer/songwriter
 John Dust - rapper known as Pigeon John
 Chris Montez
 Jeff McDonald and brother Steve McDonald founding members of Redd Kross 
 Greg Hetson of Circle Jerks / Bad Religion
 Tyler  Okonma - rapper and musician known as Tyler, the Creator
 Casey Jones - rapper and songwriter known as Casey Veggies
 Omar Banos -  singer-songwriter known as Cuco

Other
 Olivia Harrison née Olivia Trinidad Arias - widow of Beatle George Harrison (Class of 1965)
 Ted Coombs - World record breaking roller skater (Class of 1972)

On-campus violence
The school has dealt with issues of race- related as well as gang-related fighting on campus in the past. In March 2007, gang-related fighting during lunchtime resulted in police officers from several law enforcement agencies entering the school with riot helmets and pepper spray. The school was subsequently shut down for the remainder of the day. Other gang-related issues continue to plague the school with sporadic on-campus fighting more recently.

References

External links
 Official Website
 Cougartown (Alumni site)

High schools in Los Angeles County, California
Public high schools in California
Hawthorne, California
1951 establishments in California